Charles Adam (1780–1853), was a British naval officer.

Charles or Charlie Adam may also refer to:

Sir Charles Elphinstone Adam, 1st Baronet (1859–1922) of the Adam baronets
 Charlie Adam (born 1985), Scottish international football midfielder
 Charlie Adam (footballer, born 1919) (1919–1996), Scottish football outside left
 Charlie Adam (footballer, born 1962) (1962–2012), Scottish football midfielder, father of the footballer born 1985

See also
Charles Adams (disambiguation)